The Petroleum (Transfer of Licences) Act 1936 (26 Geo. 5 & 1 Edw. 8 c. 27) is an Act of the Parliament of the United Kingdom which empowered local authorities, that had granted licences to keep petroleum spirit, to transfer a licence to another person or persons.

The Petroleum (Transfer of Licences) Act (Northern Ireland) 1937 (1 Edw. 8 & 1 Geo. 6 ch. 4) is an Act of Parliament of Northern Ireland which made provision for the transfer of petroleum spirit licences in Northern Ireland.

Background 
The Petroleum (Consolidation) Act 1928 had prohibited the keeping of petroleum spirit without a licence. Local authorities were empowered under the 1928 Act to grant petroleum-spirit licences, and they could attach such conditions as they thought expedient to such licences. In the case of a change of ownership of premises the licensing authority would transfer the licence to the new occupier. However, legal advice by the Home Office identified that in the absence of any express authorisation in the 1928 Act, there was in fact no power to transfer a licence from a holder to another person. The 1936 Act remedied this defect and gave effect to the proper transfer of licences.

Petroleum (Transfer of Licences) Act 1936 
The Petroleum (Transfer of Licences) Act 1936 (26 Geo. 5 & 1 Edw. 8 c. 27) received Royal Assent on 14 July 1936. Its long title is: ‘An Act to make provision with respect to the transfer of petroleum-spirit licences granted under the Petroleum (Consolidation) Act, 1928’.

Provisions 
The Act comprised two sections. Section 1 empowered local authorities, and the Secretary of State, to transfer a petroleum spirit licence to another licensee. The Act was retrospective and applied to licences transferred since the passing of the 1928 Act. Section 2 construed the 1936 Act to be one with the 1928 Act and may be cited together as the Petroleum (Regulation) Acts 1928 and 1936.

Petroleum (Transfer of Licences) Act (Northern Ireland) 1937 
The Petroleum (Transfer of Licences) Act (Northern Ireland) 1937 (1 Edw. 8 & 1 Geo. 6 ch. 4) is an Act of Parliament of Northern Ireland which made provision for the transfer of petroleum spirit licences in Northern Ireland.

The Act received Royal Assent on 6 May 1937. Its long title is ‘An Act to make provision with respect to the transfer of petroleum-spirit licences granted under the Petroleum (Consolidation) Act (Northern Ireland), 1929.’ It comprised two sections

 Section 1. Transfer of petroleum-spirit licences.
 (1)  A local authority empowered to grant petroleum-spirit licences may transfer a petroleum-spirit licence, by endorsement of the licence or otherwise;
 (2) The licence shall authorise the keeping of petroleum-spirit by the transferee and shall cease to authorise the keeping of petroleum spirit by any other person;
 (3) The Act shall have effect as if the provisions of this section had been contained in the original Act;
 (4) In respect of a transfer of a petroleum-spirit licence made after the commencement of this Act, there shall be payable by the transferee a fee.
 Section 2.  Short title, construction and citation.

The 1937 Act shall be construed as one with the Petroleum (Consolidation) Act (Northern Ireland), 1929 (1929 c.13), and that Act and this may be cited together as the Petroleum (Regulation) Acts (Northern Ireland), 1929 and 1937. The 1937 Act is still (in 2020) current legislation.

Later enactments 
The Petroleum (Regulation) Acts 1928 and 1936 were repealed on 1 October 2014 by the Petroleum (Consolidation) Regulations 2014 (Statutory Instrument, S.I. 2014/1637).

See also 

 Petroleum Act

References 

United Kingdom Acts of Parliament 1934
History of the petroleum industry in the United Kingdom